"Chuck Versus the Fake Name" is a third-season episode of the television series Chuck. It was the eighth episode of the season, and the first to air after a two-week hiatus for the 2010 Winter Olympics. Chuck must juggle his new relationship with Hannah while at the same time taking on the role of an assassin hired by the Ring.

Plot summary

Main Plot
Sarah, Shaw and Casey apprehend a deadly and elusive assassin named Rafe Gruber. When Chuck arrives at Castle after their operation, he is informed he will be taking Gruber's place in a meeting with the contacts who have Gruber's target. After briefly studying his mannerisms, Chuck and Casey rendezvous with the contacts at a bar, two mobsters named Matty and Scotty, while Sarah and Shaw monitor from the van, and he successfully passes himself off as the assassin. However one of the goons recognizes Casey as an agent and mentions the name "Alex Coburn," which causes Chuck to flash. Chuck managed to remain in-character and, at Casey's subtle prompting, proceeds to torture him for information and extracts one of Casey's teeth in the process. The contacts are appeased, and Chuck's cover is further strengthened by a "raid" led by Shaw and Sarah. Chuck flashes on martial arts and "defeats" the federal agents, allowing himself and his two new "accomplices" to escape. They agree to meet again later when the situation calms down.

Later back at Castle, Chuck apologizes to Casey for pulling his tooth, but Casey instead remarks that he was impressed and proud of how he handled the situation. Rafe is taken into custody by Federal agents, and Chuck returns home for dinner with Ellie, Devon and Hannah, which Sarah and Shaw had prepared while he was debriefing. The next morning at the Buy More, Hannah mistakenly answers a call from the mobsters for Chuck, who say they will be at the store shortly. Chuck hurriedly gets back into character and meets them at the loading dock, where they smash his watch and give him a gold one as a gift to replace it, then take him to an apartment high-rise where he can gain access to his target. As they arrive, Chuck looks across to another apartment complex, a shot of over half a mile, through the sniper scope, and is stunned to learn that his target is Shaw, and that Sarah is with him.

Chuck inadvertently reveals his feelings for Sarah to Matty and Scotty, and takes advantage of their sympathies as an opportunity to "confront" his rival face-to-face, and warn Shaw that he is the Ring's target. Chuck punches Shaw and the two get into a fight to play up to the mobsters. Meanwhile, Gruber escapes custody and tracks Chuck's whereabouts. He kills both goons, who remained behind to "cover" him from their apartment, then makes his way across to deal with the team. He quickly disables Chuck, Sarah, and Shaw and, realizing that Chuck and Shaw both have feelings for her, takes Sarah hostage. Before he can kill her, Casey, who has also tracked Chuck's location, kills him with the sniper rifle.

Chuck and Family
Ellie confronts Devon about Chuck's secret relationship with Hannah, although Devon ineffectively feigns innocence in keeping secrets from her. Ellie decides to confront Chuck, but when she arrives at his and Morgan's apartment, runs into Hannah instead. Chuck invites them all to a dinner at the apartment that night so they can get to know each other. While Chuck is busy masquerading as Gruber, Sarah and Shaw fix dinner for him, and narrowly flee the apartment as Chuck, his family, and Hannah return home. There, Hannah admits she finally feels like she's found somewhere she belongs, and invites Chuck to meet her family the next evening. However Chuck is profoundly disturbed by how much he has changed and how easy it's become for him to lie to the people he cares about, and Ellie recognizes that however much he likes Hannah, he is still in love with Sarah. To protect Hannah from his job, he admits to her that there are things he can never tell her, and breaks up with her.

Shaw and Sarah
Following the events of the previous episode, Shaw continues his pursuit of Sarah. Sarah initially evades his advances, and tells him that she wants to break her habit of being involved with people she is partners with. She, like Chuck, is disturbed with how much he has changed and how easily he has learned to lie. She visits Shaw at his apartment and admits that watching Chuck make the transition into becoming a full-fledged spy has led her to question who she really is. Sarah then tells Shaw that her real first name is Sam. They kiss, but are interrupted by Chuck, who overheard them while carrying out his role as Gruber (see above). After the real Gruber is killed, Shaw is forced to remain in Castle now that they know the Ring has learned Shaw is still alive, and he and Sarah begin a relationship.

Production

"Chuck Versus the Fake Name" first aired on March 1, 2010. It aired following significant controversy among the viewers over its preceding episode, "Chuck Versus the Mask", which was exacerbated by the Olympic break. "Chuck Versus the Mask" was not originally intended to serve as a mid-season cliffhanger, but was the result of the season premier being moved up to January 10.

Production details
 There are several fake names that the title can refer to.
The most prominent reference is Rafe Gruber, the alias Chuck uses throughout the episode.
Sarah tells Shaw that her real first name, a mystery since the second episode of the series, is Sam.
One of Chuck's flashes was on the name "Alex Coburn", a name that is later revealed to be Casey's real name.
 The characters of Matty and Scotty directly make light of the will they/won't they subplot at the center of the fan reaction to "Chuck Versus the Mask".

Flashes
Chuck flashes on Rafe Gruber's name.
He flashes again when one of the mobsters mentions the name Alex Coburn.
In the same scene, Chuck flashes on advanced martial arts to "defeat" a special ops team led by Sarah and Shaw.

Reception

"Chuck Versus the Fake Name" pulled in 6.7 million viewers for a 2.4 demo.

Reviews of the episode have mostly been positive. Alan Sepinwall of the Star-Ledger found the episode one of the season's best. He cited the balance of humor and darker edge the season has been taken, along with the manner in which Levi performed Chuck's assuming of Gruber's personality, commenting that "the joke was written, directed (by Jeremiah Chechik), and played by Levi on just the right level: funny to those of us who know how un-Chuck-like the role is, but just believable enough to the likes of Paulie Walnuts." He also praised the way the arc beginning in "Chuck Versus the Nacho Sampler" portrayed Chuck's growing uncertainty of who he has become, and the way in which it sparked Sarah's own introspection on who she really is. However he acknowledged that the meta-humor of characters within the episode noting their dislike of "will they/won't they" angst is a sign that such a plot has run its course.

However, some reviews were less enthusiastic. Maureen Ryan of the Chicago Tribune noted that although the premise of the season is intriguing, the execution has often fallen short, including both this episode and "Chuck Versus the Mask".  She praised Yvonne Strahovski's performance and the character arc Sarah has been following as the season progressed, but found the Sarah/Shaw relationship unbelievable and also found fault in the ending of Chuck's relationship with Hannah. Elements such as the "real name" scene were awkward, Johnny Messner's performance was wooden, and the gangsters portrayed by Sirico and Lombardi were not funny. Ryan also noted the Buy More subplot felt tacked on.

IGN rated the episode an 8.8/10.

References to popular culture
The assassin's name, Rafe Gruber, pays homage to Die Hard villain Hans Gruber.
Chuck implies that Shaw isn't good-looking, unless "you're into the strong, Superman-y type of guy," referencing Brandon Routh's role as Superman in Superman Returns. As he tell that to Hannah, played by Kristin Kreuk, it is also a reference to her role in Smallville.
Gruber using a pen to escape is a reference to Silence of the Lambs, where Hannibal Lecter escapes in the same manner.
Chuck makes references to making Ellie's favorite dish, chicken pepperoni, which is a key plot device of the 1980 comedy Seems Like Old Times starring Goldie Hawn, Chevy Chase and Charles Grodin.

References

External links 
 

Fake Name
2010 American television episodes